Emily Tyra (born November 9, 1987) is an American actress, singer and dancer.

A native of Minneapolis, Tyra grew up studying dance, music, acting and improvisation. Trained in classical ballet, Tyra began her professional career in 2005 as a dancer with the Boston Ballet. In 2011, she made her Broadway debut as a singer and dancer in Hugh Jackman: Back on Broadway. Recent appearances have included portrayal of Dr. Noa Kean in CBS' Code Black television series and Sasha in the horror-comedy film Harpoon.

Early life and training 

Tyra was born on November 9, 1987 in Minneapolis, Minnesota. From 1998 to 2005 she studied tap, jazz and classical ballet in numerous pre-professional dance programs, including those offered by Ballet Arts Minnesota, Kaatsbaan International Dance Center, The Joffrey Ballet and on scholarship with the American Ballet Theatre.

Career

Ballet and contemporary dance 

Selected by audition from more than 300 dancers, Tyra moved to Boston in the summer of 2005 and started her professional career with the Boston Ballet.  As an apprentice dancer, she trained with the company’s next generation of dancers and performed in their holiday season production of The Nutcracker. She also served as an ensemble spokesperson at many media and fundraising events.

Upon completing the 2005-2006 season, Tyra turned down a professional contract to perform full-time with the Boston Ballet. She returned to Minneapolis and joined the James Sewell Ballet. For the next three years, she danced both contemporary and new works with this ensemble, focusing heavily on improvisation, multi-disciplinary performance and collaboration with the Twin Cities performing arts community.

Musical theater 

After leaving the James Sewell Ballet, Tyra continued her career in theater. In 2009, Tyra had ensemble roles in Singin’ in the Rain and Dirty Rotten Scoundrels at the Ordway Center in Saint Paul and the Walnut Street Theatre in Philadelphia, respectively.  She also performed as a member of the ensemble in Disney’s Beauty and the Beast at the Ordway.

Broadway 

Relocating from Minneapolis to New York City to pursue a career on Broadway, Tyra made her Broadway debut in 2011 with Hugh Jackman in his acclaimed Back on Broadway concert series. From 2011 to 2013, Tyra appeared in other Broadway and Off-Broadway musicals and development projects, including The City Club, Chaplin, Nice Work If You Can Get It, Can-Can and An American in Paris.

Following the cancellation of Code Black in 2018, Tyra returned to musical theater after being recruited for the lead role of Cassie Ferguson in a re-choreographed revival of A Chorus Line at the Signature Theatre.

Television and film 

Beyond Broadway, Tyra has appeared in a number of television and film projects. Following co-starring appearances in several episodes of HBO’s Boardwalk Empire, she undertook the role of Mia Bialy in Flesh and Bone, a Starz miniseries of 8 episodes that was first broadcast in November 2015. In 2016, she joined the cast of CBS’s Code Black television series, portraying Dr. Noa Kean in 29 episodes spanning Seasons 2 and 3. She remained a member of the main cast until the series was cancelled in 2018.

Tyra also continues to undertake projects with independent filmmakers, most notably to date being the portrayal of Sasha in comedic horror film Harpoon. At its world premiere at the Rotterdam International Film Festival in January 2019, the film garnered positive reviews by the press.

Personal life 
In March 2019, Tyra was diagnosed with a malignant brain tumor and later underwent surgery to remove it. After her wedding to Adam Santucci in June 2019, and a brief period of recovery, Tyra returned to the performing stage in November 2019 as Cassie Ferguson in A Chorus Line. Under medical treatment as of late 2019, she remains open about her condition and has become an advocate for the cancer community.

Performances

TV series

Film

Theater

Dance

References

Further reading 

 
 
 

1987 births
21st-century American actresses
21st-century American dancers
21st-century ballet dancers
Actresses from Minneapolis
American female dancers
American stage actresses
American television actresses
Living people